Mikhailovsky Square (Belarusian Mihajlauski Square) is a public garden in Minsk, Belarus. It is located between Leningradskaya, Sverdlov, Kirov streets and Mikhailovsky lane on the territory of the Oktyabrsky district of Minsk, near the borders of the Moscow and Leninsky districts.

History 
The square near the Vilensky Market was founded in 1925. In 1934, it was renamed into Mikhailovsky Square. In 1998, it was reopened after reconstruction.

Sightseeing 
The park is famous for the sculptural groups, such as "Girl with an Umbrella" (in memory of the tragedy of May 30, 1999), "Stranger", "Smoker" by sculptor Vladimir Zhbanov.

References 

Parks in Minsk